David Beringer (1756 – 1821) was a German scientific instrument maker and craftsman. Different sources report his place of birth as either Dieppe or Nuremberg. In either case, he was recorded as living in the Lorenzseite neighborhood of Nuremberg in 1798, and in Augsburg around 1776. 

Admitted as a master craftsman in 1777, the same year as his marriage to Anna Ottillia Hofmann, Beringer is known for building cubic wooden sundials, most of which bore two signatures: his own and that of G.P. Seyfried, an associate presumably affiliated with one of the local guilds, which Beringer does not appear to have joined.

Beringer died as the result of an accident in 1821.

References

External links

German scientific instrument makers
Engineers from Nuremberg
1756 births
1821 deaths